Ogdoconta fergusoni is a moth in the family Noctuidae. It is found in Florida, southern Mississippi and southern Louisiana.

The length of the forewings is 9 mm for males and 9–10.5 mm for females. The dorsal surface ground color of the forewings is gray brown with dirty-white-tipped scales. The hindwing scales are fuscous-tipped pale gray and the terminal line is finely marked dark brown.

Etymology
The species is named in honor of Douglas Campbell Ferguson.

References

Moths described in 2013
Condicinae